"Ève lève-toi" is a pop single recorded by French Julie Pietri from her third album Le Premier Jour, and was released in August 1986. It is the best-known song of this artist and can be considered as her signature song. It achieved success in France where it topped the SNEP Singles Chart and became a popular song throughout the years.

Background and writing
This female anthem was written by Julie Pietri and Jean-Michel Bériat. The music is composed by Vincent-Marie Bouvot. The originality of this song resides particularly in the melody which is at times Arabist (Julie Pietri was born in Algeria). The videoclip was filmed in Tunisia.

In 1986, an English version was also released under the name "Listen to Your Heart". Three other versions were recorded thereafter : one more acoustic version on album Féminin singulière in 1995, another version with dance sonorities for European compilation Euro Pride 2000 and, more recently, a jazzy version as a bonus track on the album Autour de minuit in 2007.

About the song, Elia Habib, a specialist of French chart, explains : "The atmosphere built by the song is that of an Eastern Eden, scene of the Origins. The melody and the orchestration refer to the undulating play of a bewitching flute. The scenery is set, and the text completes it, with short verses without verb : desire, temptation, original sin, vague recollections... (...) The chorus appeals to the celebration of the life while (...) the second verse [is about] the contemporary woman and underlines its multiplicity."

Chart performance
In France, the single started at #48 on 9 September 1986, then climbed every week and eventually reached number one in its 13th week. It remained on the chart for 27 weeks, 16 of them spent in the top ten. It was certified Gold disc by the SNEP.

Cover versions
In 2002, the song was covered by French contestants of Star Academy 2 Emma Daumas and Anne-Laure Sibon for the album Star Academy fait sa boum.

French singer Leslie covered the song for her 2007 album 80 souvenirs.

Track listings
These are the formats of track listings of the releases of "Ève lève-toi":

 7" single - France
 "Ève lève-toi" — 3:50
 "L'homme qui aimait les femmes" — 4:10
 7" single - Europe
 "Listen to your heart" (English version of "Ève lève-toi") — 4:22
 "Norma Jean" (English version of "L'homme qui aimait les femmes") — 4:03

 12" maxi - France
 "Ève lève-toi" (remix club) — 5:52
 "Ève lève-toi" — 3:50
 12" maxi - Europe
 "Listen to Your Heart" (extended club remix) — 6:42
 "Norma Jean" — 4:03

Charts

Certifications and sales

References

1986 singles
Julie Pietri songs
SNEP Top Singles number-one singles
Songs with feminist themes